EdenTree is an investment management firm operating as a subsidiary of Ecclesiastical Insurance Group and wholly owned by Benefact Group.

History
Formerly known as Ecclesiastical Investment Management Limited, it was rebranded EdenTree in 2015 as the word 'Ecclesiastical' was not thought to resonate with asset management and the company wanted to broaden its appeal beyond its traditional clergy investors. As its former name suggests, EdenTree was started as a means for Church of England dioceses to build wealth to support their clergy. Its remit now extends beyond the Church of England to encompass wider charitable and ethical concerns.

The senior fund manager said at the time of rebranding that being linked to the Church of England can be a “double-edged sword”, enticing for some investors but scary for others. “We have a number of Church of England dioceses that invest with us. But, equally, for some [investors] having a faith connotation can be a drawback.”

See also
Benefact Group
Ecclesiastical Insurance

References

External links
 Official website

Investment companies of the United Kingdom
Financial services companies established in 1988
Church of England
Companies based in Gloucester
Charities based in the United Kingdom
Investment management companies of the United Kingdom
1988 establishments in England